State Route 223 (SR 223) is a primary state highway in the U.S. state of Virginia. Known as Cricket Hill Road, the state highway runs  from SR 198 at Hudgins north to SR 633 on Gwynn's Island, an island at the mouth of the Piankatank River in northeastern Mathews County.

Route description

SR 223 begins at an intersection with SR 198 (Buckley Hall Road) at Hudgins. The state highway heads east and curves north through Cricket Hill. North of Cricket Hill, SR 223 crosses Milford Haven, a channel that separates Gwynn's Island from the mainland, and reaches its northern terminus at SR 633 (Old Ferry Road). SR 633 continues northeast through the island's settlements of Grimstead and Gwynn.

Major intersections

References

External links

Virginia Highways Project: VA 223

223
State Route 223